23rd CDG Awards
April 13, 2021

Contemporary: 
Promising Young Woman

Period: 
Ma Rainey's Black Bottom

Sci-Fi/Fantasy: 
Mulan
The 23rd Costume Designers Guild Awards, honoring the best costume designs in film, television, and media for 2020, was held on April 13, 2021. The nominees were announced on March 4, 2021.

Winners and nominees
The winners are in bold.

Film

Television

Short Form

References

External links
Official website

Costume Designers Guild Awards
2020 film awards
2021 television awards
2020 in fashion
2020 in American cinema
2020 in American television